Jürgen Loacker (born 14 December 1974) is an Austrian bobsledder who competed from 1999 to 2013. Competing in two Winter Olympics, he earned his best finish of 13th in the four-man event at Turin in 2006.

At the FIBT World Championships, Loacker earned his best finish of eighth in the four-man event twice (2008, 2009).

References
 
 
 Team website 
 [ Bobsleighsport.com profile]

1974 births
Austrian male bobsledders
Bobsledders at the 2006 Winter Olympics
Bobsledders at the 2010 Winter Olympics
Living people
Olympic bobsledders of Austria